Mohammad Rafique Ali Sardar (born 16 April 1998) is an Indian professional footballer who plays as a goalkeeper for Rajasthan United in the I-League.

Career
Born in Kolkata, West Bengal, Sardar rose from poverty to joining the youth academies of the two Kolkata giants East Bengal and Mohun Bagan. He soon then moved to the Tata Football Academy.

Jamshedpur FC
Before the 2017–18 season, Sardar was announced as part of the inaugural Jamshedpur squad for the Indian Super League. He made his professional debut for the club on 12 April 2018 in the Super Cup against Goa. He came on as a halftime substitute for Sairuat Kima after their #1 goalkeeper, Subrata Pal, was sent off. Jamshedpur went on to lose 1–5. A week later, on 20 April 2018, it was announced that Sardar signed a new contract with Jamshedpur, keeping him at the club till 2020.

East Bengal FC 
A couple of years later, Sardar for East Bengal FC, on 18 April 2020.

Mohammedan SC 
The head coach of Mohammedan SC(Kolkata), Jose Hevia, signed Rafique Ali Sardar from SC East Bengal in 2020 after being released by Robbie Fowler the head coach of SC East Bengal.

Career statistics

Club

Honours
Rajasthan United
Baji Rout Cup: 2022

References

External links 
 Jamshedpur FC Profile.
 Rafique Ali

1998 births
Living people
Footballers from Kolkata
Indian footballers
Tata Football Academy players
Jamshedpur FC players
East Bengal Club players
Association football goalkeepers
Rajasthan United FC players